Lake Quill is a tarn located in New Zealand's Fiordland National Park at  above sea level. It is the source of Sutherland Falls, one of the highest waterfalls in the country and seventh-highest in the world, cascading from Lake Quill in three tiers into the Arthur Valley alongside the Milford Track, approximately 20km fromMilford Sound / Piopiotahi.

The lake was named after William Quill, who climbed Sutherland Falls in 1890 to be the first European to discover the falls' source.  Although Quill climbed up the falls themselves, Lake Quill can now be reached with much less risk from McKinnon Pass on the Milford Track. It is not known that anyone has climbed Sutherland Falls since.

The lake and its falls are a popular destination for helicopter tours, which allow an encompassing view of the extreme landscape.  Reaching only the falls on foot is a multi-day hike and requires booking with the Department of Conservation or Ultimate Hikes, a company owned by Sir John Davies through Trojan Holdings.

References 

Glacial lakes
Fiordland National Park
Lakes of Southland, New Zealand